Spring Bank Farm is a large house, built in 1880 near Frederick, Maryland in the small community of Harmony Grove. The house combines Gothic Revival and Italianate architecture.  The house retains much of its historic detailing and interior fabric, as well as a number of outbuildings.

The Spring Bank Farm was listed on the National Register of Historic Places in 1984.

References

External links
, including photo in 2004, at Maryland Historical Trust
Spring Bank Farm, at Journey Through Hallowed Ground

Houses on the National Register of Historic Places in Maryland
Houses in Frederick County, Maryland
National Register of Historic Places in Frederick County, Maryland